is a professional Japanese baseball player. He plays infielder for the Yokohama DeNA BayStars.

He selected .

References

External links

 NPB.com

1988 births
Living people
Japanese baseball players
Nippon Professional Baseball first basemen
Nippon Professional Baseball second basemen
Nippon Professional Baseball third basemen
Baseball people from Saga Prefecture
Yokohama DeNA BayStars players